Dangriga is an electoral constituency in the Stann Creek District represented in the House of Representatives of the National Assembly of Belize since 2020 by Louis Zabaneh of the People's United Party.

Profile

The Dangriga constituency was created as Stann Creek Town for the 1961 general election as part of a major nationwide redistricting. The constituency assumed its current name as of the 1979 general election. It includes the town of Dangriga as well as the nearby Sarawee and Hope Creek areas. It is bordered by the Stann Creek West constituency and the Caribbean Sea.

July 2015 by-election

In June 2015 Area Rep. Ivan Ramos resigned after controversially failing to retain his standard bearer status with the People's United Party. A by-election to determine Ramos' successor was held 8 July 2015. Nominations were formally made on 22 June. Former Dangriga Mayor Frank "Papa" Mena was the UDP nominee, while retired educator Anthony Sabal stood as the PUP candidate after initial reports the PUP might not contest the by-election at all. Llewellyn Lucas from the Belize Green Independent Party was also nominated, becoming that party's first official candidate in any election since it was founded in 2012. A fourth candidate endorsed by both of Belize's other active minor parties, the People's National Party and Vision Inspired by the People, was disqualified due to holding dual citizenship. Belizean candidates for public office may not hold citizenship in any other country.

The by-election was won by Mena with 57.89 percent of the vote, giving the UDP its third consecutive by-election win dating to 2003.

Area Representatives

Elections

References

Political divisions in Belize
Dangriga (Belize House constituency)
British Honduras Legislative Assembly constituencies established in 1961
1961 establishments in British Honduras